This is a timeline of artists, albums, and events in progressive rock and its subgenres.  This article contains the timeline for the period 1960–1969.

1962–1967: Background and roots 

The roots of progressive rock developed from pop groups in the 1960s, like the Beatles and the Yardbirds, who "progressed" rock and roll by exploiting new recording techniques, and by merging electric blues with various other music styles such as Indian ragas, oriental melodies and Gregorian chants. Hegarty and Halliwell identify the Beatles, the Beach Boys, the Doors, the Pretty Things, the Zombies, the Byrds, the Grateful Dead and Pink Floyd as "not merely as precursors of prog" but "essential developments of progressiveness in its early days". According to musicologist Walter Everett, the Beatles' "experimental timbres, rhythms, tonal structures, and poetic texts" on their albums Rubber Soul (1965) and Revolver (1966) "encouraged a legion of young bands that were to create progressive rock in the early 1970s".  Dylan's poetry, the Mothers of Invention's album Freak Out! (1966) and the Beatles' Sgt. Pepper's Lonely Hearts Club Band (1967) were all important in progressive rock's development. The productions of Phil Spector were key influences, as they introduced the possibility of using the recording studio to create music that otherwise could never be achieved. The Beach Boys' Pet Sounds (1966), which Brian Wilson intended as an answer to Rubber Soul influenced the Beatles when they made Sgt. Pepper.

Folk rock groups such as the Byrds, based their initial sound on that of the Beatles. In turn, the Byrds' vocal harmonies inspired those of Yes, and British folk rock bands like Fairport Convention, who emphasised instrumental virtuosity. Some of these artists, such as the Incredible String Band and Shirley and Dolly Collins, would prove influential on progressive rock through their use of instruments borrowed from world music and early music.

Recordings influential on later progressive rock bands

Date of formation of bands who are later identified as progressive

Disbandments
 The Syn (1967–1969)
 The Wilde Flowers (1967–1968)

Events

 David Gilmour joins Pink Floyd in December 1967.

1968

Newly formed bands

Albums

Disbandments
 The United States of America

Events
 Syd Barrett leaves Pink Floyd in April 1968.

1969

Newly formed bands

Albums

See also
 Timeline of progressive rock: other decades: 1970s – 1980s – 1990s – 2000s – 2010s – 2020s
 Timeline of progressive rock (Parent article)
 Progressive rock
 Canterbury scene
 Symphonic rock
 Avant-rock
 Rock in Opposition
 Neo-progressive rock
 Progressive metal
 Jazz fusion

References

Further reading
 Snider, Charles. The Strawberry Bricks Guide To Progressive Rock. Chicago, Ill.: Lulu Publishing (2008) 364 pages,  (paperback). A veritable record guide to progressive rock, with band histories, musical synopses and critical commentary, all presented in the historical context of a timeline.
 Lucky, Jerry.  The Progressive Rock Files Burlington, Ontario: Collector's Guide Publishing, Inc (1998), 304 pages,  (paperback).  Gives an overview of progressive rock's history as well as histories of the major and underground bands in the genre.
 Macan, Edward.  Rocking the Classics:  English Progressive Rock and the Counterculture. Oxford:  Oxford University Press (1997), 290 pages,  (hardcover),  (paperback).  Analyzes progressive rock using classical musicology and also sociology.

Timeline
Progressive rock
Timeline of progressive rock
1960s in music
Music history by genre